The third season of the Japanese science fiction action anime TV series Log Horizon premiered on NHK Educational TV January 13, 2021, and concluded on March 31, 2021, with a total of 12 episodes. The series is based on the novels written by Mamare Touno. The season was originally scheduled to premiere in October 2020, but had been delayed to January 2021 due to the COVID-19 pandemic. Season 3 is titled , named after the title of Volume 12 of the web novel series.

The cast and staff reprised their roles from the second season.


Episode list

Notes

References

External links
  
 

2021 Japanese television seasons
Anime postponed due to the COVID-19 pandemic
03